The Lofoi Falls (also known as the Chutes Kaloba and the Chutes Lofoi) is a waterfall in Kundelungu National Park, Katanga Province, Democratic Republic of the Congo. Plunging down for an unbroken 340 m, it is one of the largest waterfalls in Central Africa. The waters of the Lofoi are a tributary of the Lufira River. The falls shrink quite a bit during the drier season of June to October, but are quite dramatic during the rest of the year.

References

External links
Picture of the Falls
Map of Kundelungu National Park

 Waterfalls of the Democratic Republic of the Congo